Verdena Leona Parker (née Chase) is the last fluent speaker of the Hupa language, an Athabaskan language spoken by the Hoopa Valley Tribe, indigenous to northern California. While other children of her generation were sent to boarding schools, isolating them from their families, Parker was raised by her grandmother, who spoke Hupa with her. Through adulthood, Parker continued to speak Hupa with her mother daily, maintaining a high level of fluency despite language loss in the rest of the Hupa community.

Beginning in 2008 and continuing through the present, Parker has regularly worked with researchers at UC Berkeley and Stanford to provide recordings of spoken Hupa for the documentation of the Hupa language. She is also active in language revitalization projects.

References

External links 
 Survey of California and Other Indian Languages - Mission
 Survey of California and Other Indian Languages - Projects

1936 births
Living people
Last known speakers of a Native American language
Hupa
Native American people from Oregon
20th-century Native American women
20th-century Native Americans
21st-century Native American women
21st-century Native Americans